Hyder Edward "Scotty" Barr (October 6, 1886 – December 2, 1934) was a Major League Baseball player. An alumnus of Davidson College, he was born in Bristol, Tennessee and died in Ft. Worth, Texas.

External links
Baseball Reference.com page

1886 births
1934 deaths
Philadelphia Athletics players
Baseball players from Tennessee
People from Bristol, Tennessee
Major League Baseball infielders
Minor league baseball managers
Atlanta Crackers players
New Orleans Pelicans (baseball) players
Mobile Sea Gulls players
Birmingham Barons players
Chattanooga Lookouts players
New Haven White Wings players
Shreveport Gassers players
San Antonio Bronchos players
Davidson College alumni
Davidson Wildcats baseball players